Seth Farber (born 1967) is an American-Israeli Modern Orthodox rabbi, historian, and founder and director of the Jewish life advocacy organization, ITIM.

Early life and education
Farber grew up in Riverdale, Bronx, New York. He received a BA from New York University, was ordained as a rabbi by  the  Rabbi Isaac Elchanan Theological Seminary of Yeshiva University in 1991, received an MA in  Judaic Studies from Yeshiva University in 1995, and a PhD from the Hebrew University in Jerusalem in 2000.

Farber's great-great-great-grandfather was the pre-eminent Central European Rabbi Moshe Sofer, better known as the Chasam Sofer (or Chatam Sofer).

Career
Farber was a teacher at the Maimonides School in Brookline, Massachusetts. After moving to Israel, he founded ITIM, an organization committed to increasing participation in Jewish life by making Israel's religious establishment responsive to the diverse Jewish needs of the Jewish people. Farber is dedicated to "breaking the ultra-Orthodox monopoly over Jewish life in Israel," and to protecting Jewish Israelis' civil rights, particularly those of immigrants from the former Soviet Union. Farber is widely cited in the press on issues of religion-and-State in Israel.

The New York Times called Farber a "pragmatic idealist" who believes that Orthodox Jews — including the rabbinate — and non-Orthodox Jews need to learn "to trust each other" sufficiently to work together on difficult issues of personal status.

In 2015, Farber was awarded a Nefesh B'Nefesh Bonei Zion Prize, and in 2018, received an Israel Ministry of Aliyah and Integration Award for Outstanding Contribution to Israeli Society.

From 2018-2022 he served on the board of governors of the university of Haifa. 

In 2021-2022 he wrote a Friday column for Israel Hayom, Israel’s largest daily newspaper.

In 2022 he was appointed by Israel’s finance minister and health minister to sit on the 18-member committee that decides on medicines, services and technologies to be included in Israel’s health basket.

Personal life
Farber is married to Michelle Cohen Farber. They have five children: Moshe, Chani, Shira, Esti, and Tali, and live in Ra'anana, Israel.

Selected works

Books

References

External links
ITIM website

American Modern Orthodox rabbis
Israeli Modern Orthodox rabbis
Living people
Rabbi Isaac Elchanan Theological Seminary semikhah recipients
New York University alumni
Hebrew University of Jerusalem alumni
People from the Bronx
People from Riverdale, Bronx
Year of birth missing (living people)
American emigrants to Israel
Bonei Zion Prize recipients
Historians of Jews and Judaism
21st-century American Jews